Didier Pfirter (born 1959, in Basel) is a Swiss diplomat.

He was the legal advisor to Álvaro de Soto, the Special Cyprus Advisor of the UN's Secretary-General Kofi Annan and Ambassador at Large for Special Assignments at the Swiss Ministry for Foreign Affairs.

Pfirter was appointed Swiss ambassador to Colombia in 2008.

External links
Appointment as ambassador to Colombia

1959 births
Living people
Ambassadors of Switzerland to Colombia
Swiss officials of the United Nations